Anderson Hernández Mejia (born October 30, 1982) is a Dominican former professional baseball infielder. He played in Major League Baseball (MLB) for the New York Mets, Washington Nationals, Cleveland Indians, and Houston Astros as well as for the Chunichi Dragons of Nippon Professional Baseball (NPB).

Professional career

Detroit Tigers
In the minor leagues, Hernández showed poor patience and high strikeouts typical of a teenager and did not rise past single-A until . In his first season, he batted .264/.303/.389 with 34 stolen bases in just 216 at-bats. However, he progressed slowly. In , playing in High-A ball, he showed poor hitting skills, batting just .259/.310/.339. The next season was even worse. Hernandez struggled to hit above the Mendoza line, (.229/.278/.295) and stole just 15 bases. But the next season started off well for him. After batting .295 with 11 RBI in about 100 AB, he was called up to Double-A Erie where he batted .274 with 5 home runs, 29 RBI, and 17 stolen bases. In January 2005, Hernández was traded to the New York Mets for catcher Vance Wilson.

New York Mets
In January 2005, Hernández was traded to the New York Mets for catcher Vance Wilson. Due to the knee injury of Kazuo Matsui, Hernández was the starting second baseman for the Mets to start the  season, but he too was soon injured and placed on the 15-day DL. He returned later in the season and hit his first Major League home run on September 19, 2006, off Florida Marlins pitcher Scott Olsen. He is widely known to Mets fans for pinch-running for Paul LoDuca in the bottom of the ninth inning in Game 7 of the 2006 NLCS against the St. Louis Cardinals, representing the winning run with two out, but Carlos Beltrán struck out to end the game. In 2007, he made many appearances as a pinch-runner or a late inning defensive replacement, as he only collected three at-bats and went 1–3. On August 20, Hernández was dealt to the Washington Nationals as a player to be named later for relief pitcher Luis Ayala.

Washington Nationals

On August 20, Hernández was dealt to the Washington Nationals as a player to be named later for relief pitcher Luis Ayala. He was the starter at second for the Nationals. On August 6, 2009, Hernández was traded back to the Mets for minor league infielder Greg Veloz.

Return to the Mets
Hernández was traded back to the Mets on August 6, 2009, for minor league infielder Greg Veloz. On March 17, 2010, Hernández was claimed off waivers by the Cleveland Indians.

Cleveland Indians
On March 17, 2010, Hernández was claimed off waivers by the Cleveland Indians. He was assigned to Triple-A Columbus on April 8. On June 8, 2010, the Indians purchased Hernández's contract and placed him on the active roster. Hernández had the opportunity to compete for the starting second baseman position, but lost to Jayson Nix; he was subsequently used in a utility infielder role. On July 18, 2010, Hernández was designated for assignment to make room on the active roster for pitcher Jeanmar Gómez. Hernández was claimed off waivers by the Houston Astros on July 21, 2010.

Houston Astros
Hernández was claimed off waivers by the Houston Astros on July 21, 2010. He was added to the 25-man roster on July 22, 2010.

Hernández became a free agent after the 2010 season. He re-signed with the Astros in November 2010.

Pittsburgh Pirates
Hernández signed a minor league contract with the Pittsburgh Pirates on December 21, 2011. In November 2012, Hernández re-signed with the Pirates.

Dominican Republic
Hernández currently has played in his native country, the Dominican Republic, for Tigres del Licey. He won the Rookie of the Year in the regular season and also the MVP during the finals. He and shortstop Erick Aybar are called "los menores" (Spanish for "the kids") and were known as one of the best middle infields in the Dominican Republic.

Chunichi Dragons

On December 12, 2013, Hernandez was unveiled by the Chunichi Dragons in the NPB as a new signing ahead of their 2014 campaign.

On 29 October, 2016, it was confirmed that Hernandez would be released from the Dragons along with Ricardo Nanita, Juan Jaime, Drew Naylor and Leyson Septimo.

Vaqueros Unión Laguna
On April 10, 2017, Hernandez signed with the Vaqueros Unión Laguna of the Mexican Baseball League.

Tecolotes de los Dos Laredos
On February 9, 2018, Hernandez was traded to the Tecolotes de los Dos Laredos of the Mexican Baseball League. He was released on May 1, 2018.

Olmecas de Tabasco
On July 3, 2018, Hernandez signed with the Olmecas de Tabasco of the Mexican Baseball League. He became a free agent following the 2018 season.

References

External links

1982 births
Living people
Binghamton Mets players
Chunichi Dragons players
Cleveland Indians players
Dominican Republic expatriate baseball players in Japan
Dominican Republic expatriate baseball players in Mexico
Dominican Republic expatriate baseball players in the United States
Erie SeaWolves players
Estrellas Orientales players
Columbus Clippers players
Gulf Coast Tigers players
Houston Astros players
Indianapolis Indians players
Lakeland Tigers players
Major League Baseball players from the Dominican Republic
Major League Baseball second basemen
Major League Baseball shortstops
Major League Baseball third basemen
Mexican League baseball second basemen
Mexican League baseball shortstops
Mexican League baseball third basemen
New Orleans Zephyrs players
New York Mets players
Nippon Professional Baseball second basemen
Nippon Professional Baseball shortstops
Nippon Professional Baseball third basemen
Norfolk Tides players
Oklahoma City RedHawks players
Olmecas de Tabasco players
Piratas de Campeche players
Round Rock Express players
St. Lucie Mets players
Syracuse Chiefs players
Tecolotes de los Dos Laredos players
Tigres del Licey players
Vaqueros Unión Laguna players
Washington Nationals players